Ecdytolopha is a genus of moths belonging to the subfamily Olethreutinae of the family Tortricidae.

Species
Ecdytolopha beckeri Adamski & Brown, 2001
Ecdytolopha coloradana Adamski & Brown, 2001
Ecdytolopha exploramae Adamski & Brown, 2001
Ecdytolopha holodesma (Walsingham, 1914)
Ecdytolopha insiticiana Zeller, 1875
Ecdytolopha leonana Adamski & Brown, 2001
Ecdytolopha mana (Kearfott, 1907)
Ecdytolopha occidentana Adamski & Brown, 2001
Ecdytolopha ricana Adamski & Brown, 2001
Ecdytolopha sinaloana Adamski & Brown, 2001

See also
List of Tortricidae genera

References

External links
tortricidae.com

Tortricidae genera
Olethreutinae